FC Arabkir, is a defunct Armenian football club from the capital Yerevan. The club was founded in 1977 during the Soviet years as FC Kanaz Yerevan, representing the Armenian SSR Kanaker aluminum smelter, currently known as Rusal Armenal. In 1995, the club was renamed FC Arabkir after the Arabkir District of Yerevan. However, Arabkir was dissolved in 1997 due to financial difficulties.

League record

Achievements
SSR Armenia League: 1
 1978

References

Arabkir
Association football clubs established in 1977
Association football clubs disestablished in 1997
1977 establishments in Armenia
1997 disestablishments in Armenia